aka Emperor Hansho was the 18th Emperor of Japan, according to the traditional order of succession. Both the Kojiki, and the Nihon Shoki (collectively known as the Kiki) recorded events that took place during Hanzei's alleged lifetime. No firm dates can be assigned to this Emperor's life or reign, but he is conventionally considered to have reigned from 406 CE to 410 CE. His family included an "Imperial Lady", and "Concubine" which bore him 4 children. Historians have stated that while nothing remarkable took place during Hanzei's brief reign, he did have ranked concubines which is an introduced Chinese custom. 

Hanzei died sometime in 410 AD without naming an heir to the throne which caused Imperial ministers to name a successor. While the location of Hanzei's grave is unknown, he is traditionally venerated at a memorial Shinto tomb. Modern historians have come to the conclusion that the title of "Emperor" and the name "Hanzei" were used by later generations to describe him. There is also a general consensus regarding Hanzei's factual existence.

Protohistoric narrative
The Japanese have traditionally accepted this sovereign's historical existence, and a mausoleum (misasagi) for Hanzei is currently maintained. These chronicles include legends and myths, as well as potential historical facts that have since been exaggerated and/or distorted over time. It's recorded in the Kiki that Hanzei was born to  sometime in 352 AD, and was given the name . He was the third son of Emperor Nintoku, and a younger brother of Emperor Richū. The phrase Mizu ha in the name Mizuhawake translates to beautiful teeth, as he was said to have beautiful "exceptionally large" "teeth like one bone" all of the same size. Only the Kojiki mentions the alleged full grown height of Emperor Hanzei which is said to have been . Shortly after Nintoku died, his elder brother  attempted to  assassinate his eldest brother  (Richū). Mizuhawake was able to bribe one of Nakatsu's retainers into killing Nakatsu in order to prove his loyalty to the future emperor.

According to the Nihon Shoki, Richū bypassed his own children to make his younger brother Mizuhawake crown prince in 401 AD. The given reason is that a Tajihi flower fell into a well which gave the name of Mizuhawake as the next heir to be. Mizuhawake was proclaimed as "Emperor Hanzei" upon Richū's death in 405 AD, and was enthroned sometime in the following year. Shortly after his enthronement Hanzei took  as an "Imperial concubine", and eventually her younger sister  as a consort. The two Empresses bore him 4 children which consisted of 2 sons and 2 daughters. During Emperor Hanzei's reign, he ruled from the palace Shibagaki no Miya at Tajihi in the province of Kawachi (present-day Matsubara, Osaka). During his five year reign the country enjoyed a time of peace. Emperor Hanzei died peacefully in his palace sometime in 410 AD without naming an heir (crown prince). This issue was later settled by Imperial ministers who selected Emperor Nintoku's youngest son Ingyō as the next emperor.

Known information

Hanzei is regarded by historians as a ruler during the early 5th century whose existence is generally accepted as fact. Scholar Francis Brinkley lists Emperor Hanzei under "Protohistoric sovereigns", but notes that his short reign was "not remarkable for anything" except for indirect evidence that Chinese customs were beginning to be adopted by the Japanese court. Scholar William George Aston notes in his translation of the Nihon Shoki that "three ranks of concubines are mentioned", which at the time were of Chinese origin (ranked concubines). Others such as author Ryoichi Maenosono (Kokushi Daijiten) identify Emperor Hanzei with "King Chin of the Five kings of Wa. According to Chinese records, King Chin sent a tribute to the Liu Song dynasty in 438 AD.

He went on to say that "the English equivalents used in this passage correspond but approximately to the modern Japanese standards". As for Hanzei's ascension, the Nihon Shoki mentions that Tajihi is now known as the itadori flower. Aston notes though, that the story of a Tajihi flower falling into a well is inconsistent with a later passage in the Nihon Shoki which refers to Tajihi as a location (not a flower).

There is no evidence to suggest that the title tennō was used during the time to which Hanzei's reign has been assigned. Rather, it was presumably , meaning "the great king who rules all under heaven". An alternate title could have also been  "Great King of Yamato". The name Hanzei-tennō was more than likely assigned to him posthumously by later generations. His name might have been regularized centuries after the lifetime ascribed to Hanzei, possibly during the time in which legends about the origins of the Yamato dynasty were compiled as the chronicles known today as the Kojiki.

While the actual site of Hanzei's grave is not known, this regent is traditionally venerated at a kofun-type Imperial tomb in Sakai, Osaka. The Imperial Household Agency designates this location as Hanzei's mausoleum, and is formally named formally named . Outside of the Kiki, the reign of Emperor Kinmei ( – 571 AD) is the first for which contemporary historiography has been able to assign verifiable dates. The conventionally accepted names and dates of the early Emperors were not confirmed as "traditional" though, until the reign of Emperor Kanmu between 737 and 806 AD.

Consorts and children

Imperial Lady/Concubine

Issue

Ancestry

See also

 Emperor of Japan
 List of Emperors of Japan
 Imperial cult
 Five kings of Wa

Notes

References

Further reading
 Aston, William George. (1896).  Nihongi: Chronicles of Japan from the Earliest Times to A.D. 697. London: Kegan Paul, Trench, Trubner.  
 Brown, Delmer M. and Ichirō Ishida, eds. (1979).  Gukanshō: The Future and the Past. Berkeley: University of California Press. ;  
 Ponsonby-Fane, Richard Arthur Brabazon. (1959).  The Imperial House of Japan. Kyoto: Ponsonby Memorial Society. 
 Titsingh, Isaac. (1834). Nihon Ōdai Ichiran; ou,  Annales des empereurs du Japon.  Paris: Royal Asiatic Society, Oriental Translation Fund of Great Britain and Ireland.  
 Varley, H. Paul. (1980).  Jinnō Shōtōki: A Chronicle of Gods and Sovereigns. New York: Columbia University Press. ;  

 
 

Japanese emperors
People of Kofun-period Japan
5th-century monarchs in Asia
5th-century Japanese monarchs
Japanese giants